Treasure Box is the third studio album and second Japanese release by South Korean idol group T-ara. It was released on August 7, 2013, as their first album release under Universal Music Japan sublabel EMI Records Japan in two limited editions and a regular edition. In order to promote the album,  the group kicked off their second Japan nationwide concert tour T-ara Japan Tour 2013: Treasure Box on September 4, 2013.

Release and promotion
Treasure Box was released in three editions: Pearl, Sapphire and Diamond. Pearl is the normal edition, while the Sapphire is a first press limited edition, which comes with a DVD and the Diamond is also a first press limited edition which comes with a DVD and a photobook. On August 3, their second Japanese nationwide concert tour T-ara Japan Tour 2013: Treasure Box was announced.

Despite leaving the group before the album's release, and not appearing on the cover, Areum's vocals appear throughout the album.

Track listing

Concert tour

Overview 
The album's first singles "Sexy Love" and "Bunny Style" had their own showcase tours preparing for the main album tour. T-ara held a 2-Day concert prior to the album's release and preparing for their upcoming tour. 

T-ara Japan Tour 2013: Treasure Box (stylized as T-ARA JAPAN TOUR 2013 ～Treasure Box～) was the group's second Japan nationwide concert tour, held in support of the album. The tour began on September 4, 2013, at Fukuoka Sun Palace, Japan and ended on September 27 at the Nippon Budokan in Tokyo, Japan.

Setlists

Tour dates

Charts

Sales

References

T-ara albums
Japanese-language albums
EMI Records albums
Universal Music Japan albums
2013 albums